The Higashiyama Sky Tower is located in the Higashiyama Zoo and Botanical Gardens in the city of Nagoya, central Japan.
It contains observation decks and a restaurant 100 metres above ground and is a landmark of the area.

External links 

Chikusa-ku, Nagoya
Skyscrapers in Nagoya